Immersion may refer to:

The arts
 "Immersion", a 2012 story by Aliette de Bodard
 Immersion, a French comic book series by Léo Quievreux
 Immersion (album), the third album by Australian group Pendulum
 Immersion (film), a 2021 Chilean thriller film
 Immersion (series), a webseries which test the concepts of video games in real life, created by Rooster Teeth Productions
 Immersion journalism, a style of journalism

Science and technology
 Immersion lithography or immersion microscopy, optical techniques in which liquid is between the objective and image plane in order to raise numerical aperture
 Immersion (mathematics), a smooth map whose differential is everywhere injective, related to the mathematical concept of an embedding
 Immersion (virtual reality), the perception of being physically present in a non-physical world, created by using VR

Other uses
 Immersion baptism, a type of baptism whereby the subject is immersed in water
 Immersion Corporation, a haptic technology developer
 Immersion heater, a kind of water heater
 Immersion therapy, overcoming fears through confrontation
 Language immersion, a method of teaching a second language in which the target language is used for instruction